The Independence Day of Abkhazia (Russian: День независимости Абхазии) also known among Abkhazians as Liberation Day (Russian: День освобождения) or Victory Day (Russian: День победы) is the main state holiday in the partially recognized Republic of Abkhazia. It celebrates the end of the War in Abkhazia (1992–1993) and the declaration of independence. This date is celebrated on September 30.

Background 
September 30 was chosen as the Independence Day to commemorate the date on which the Georgian government troops and ethnic Georgians were driven out by the Abkhaz secessionist forces and their allies from much of Abkhazia, including the capital, Sukhumi, in a series of fierce battles during the war in Abkhazia in 1993. On August 14, 1992, troops of the State Council of Georgia led by Tengiz Kitovani entered in Abkhazia. The Museum of War Glory in central Sukhumi, which was opened in December 2014, has artifacts and memorabilia from the war.

Celebrations 

Many citizens and veterans are awarded the title of Hero of Abkhazia on this day. The military parade on Freedom Square is usually the main event on jubilee years (every 5 years). 2018 celebrated the 25th anniversary of the Victory in the Patriotic War, which included the parading of a captured T-55 tank with the call sign "01" on Freedom Square.

Russian celebrations

Members of the Russian Federation's 7th Military Base in Abkhazia celebrate Liberation Day with an annual military parade at the base as well as with a joint ceremony with the Abkhazian Armed Forces.

Official government programme
The official government program during the celebrations runs from 11:00 am to 6:00 pm.

 11:00 - Laying of flowers at the Memorial Complex to the victims of the war. 
 12:00 - Military parade in the Park of Military Glory
 13:00 - Laying of flowers at the Memorial the first President of Abkhazia Vladislav Ardzinba 
 14:00 - Laying of flowers at the grave of former President of Abkhazia Sergey Bagapsh 
 17:00 - Gala concert in the R. Gumba Philharmonic 
 18:00 - A theatrical performance events from the war.

Jubilee military parade
Every five years, a military parade in honor of the jubilee anniversary of the Victory and Independence of Abkhazia is held on Freedom Square in Sukhumi. It usually begins with the State Flag and the Victory Banner of Abkhazia being brought onto the Square. The parade commander then reports to the Minister of Defense of Abkhazia, who in turn inspects the troops and reports to the Commander-in-Chief. Annual participants include formations from the armed forces, militarized formations, guests contingents from the Armed Forces of Russia and the Ministry of Defense of South Ossetia, as well as the Cossacks of the Black Sea, Don and Kuban Cossacks.

Gallery

See also 
List of national independence days
Public holidays in Abkhazia
War in Abkhazia (1992–1993)
President of Abkhazia
Minister for Defence of Abkhazia
Abkhazian Armed Forces
Abkhazian Air Force

References 

Abkhazia
September observances
Victory days